IEEE-1613 is the IEEE standard detailing environmental and testing requirements for communications networking devices in electric power substations.  The standard is sponsored by the IEEE Power & Energy Society.

External links
 (current [2009] version)
 (2011 amendments to current version)
 (superseded by 2009 version)

IEEE standards
Electric power infrastructure